A VCR is a videocassette recorder.

VCR may also refer to:
 VCR (band), a rock band from Richmond, Virginia
VCR (EP)
 "VCR" (song), a song by The xx
 Variable compression ratio
 Video Cassette Recording, an early videocassette recorder system by Philips
 Vincristine, a natural alkaloid
 Swagelok VCR - a type of vacuum equipment connectors
 Voltage-controlled resistor, electronic component
 Panhard VCR, a French armored personnel carrier